Aimetis Corp. is a technology company offering integrated intelligent video management products for security surveillance and business intelligence applications. Aimetis is located in Waterloo, Ontario, Canada.

Company name 
The name Aimetis (pronounced eye-met-iss) originates from two concepts: "AI" refers to the acronym for Artificial Intelligence, the science behind Aimetis technology. "Metis" is the name of the shape shifting Greek Titaness of wisdom and deep thought.

History 
Aimetis was founded in 2003 and launched the security industry's first intelligent, "computer vision" based Digital Video Recorder, AIRA 2400 (Artificial Intelligence Real time Analysis). AIRA 2400 went on to win Best Commercial Product at the SIA New Product Showcase.

In 2007, Aimetis was selected as a regional finalist for the Innovation Award for New Technology by Canada's National Research Council-Industrial Research Assistance Program (NRC-IRAP) in recognition for the company's technological achievements with its flagship software, AIRA v5.

In 2008, the company launched Aimetis Symphony intelligent video management software, which has become the cornerstone of the company's product line. Aimetis Symphony combines both video management and video analytics into a single product.  After the release of Symphony, the company was subsequently awarded the 2008 Global Video Analytics Product Innovation of the Year Award from Frost & Sullivan. Also in 2008, Aimetis broke into the Top 10 market share for VMS in terms of revenue for the first time, ranking seventh overall for software-only vendors of open platform network video management software.

Later in 2010, Aimetis for the first time attained Axis Communication's highest Partnership Echelon: Application Development Partner - Gold Level, and has maintained that level since.  Axis Communications also awarded Aimetis Partner of the Year for North Asia that same year, and again in 2011, 2012, and 2014.

In 2011, Aimetis expanded its product offerings to include hardware by launching the Aimetis E3200 Physical Security Appliance.  The E3200 went on to win Best in Video Storage, Distribution and Management at ISC WEST New Product Showcase by the Security Industry Association.

In 2013, Aimetis was named to Deloitte's 2013 Technology Fast 500™, a ranking of the 500 fastest growing technology, media, telecommunications, life sciences and clean technology companies in North America.  The company was also named to Deloitte Canada's Technology Fast 50™, an award that recognizes technological innovation, entrepreneurship, rapid growth and leadership in Canada.

In 2014, Aimetis launched two new products designed to reduce the total cost of ownership of IP video services, the Aimetis Thin Client and Aimetis Enterprise Manager.

In May 2015, CIBC World Markets named Aimetis as one of the Top 25 Emerging Technology Companies in Canada. In November 2015, Deloitte again named Aimetis to their Technology Fast 500™ list.

In April 2016, Aimetis was acquired by Senstar Corporation.

Aimetis has over 12,000 deployments across many vertical markets including city surveillance, commercial, education, government, healthcare, infrastructure, retail, and transportation.

They have over 50 distributors and 800+ authorized/certified reseller partners and OEMs covering more than 100 countries.

Sales 
Sample customers include:

City Surveillance / Government:  Centro de Congresos (Spain), City of Novi Sad (Serbia), City of Oshawa (Canada), Ministry of Finance (Saudi Arabia), Ministry of Interior (Qatar), Library of Congress (U.S.), Xiamen City.

Commercial / Retail:  BMW (Germany), Jägermeister (Germany), Macy's (U.S.), Nomura (Japan), Nike (Canada), Systembolaget (Sweden), Whole Foods (U.S.), Vodafone (Germany).

Education:  Dublin University (Ireland), Höjaskolan Malmö (Sweden), Khalifa University (UAE), Monash University (Australia), Princeton Regional Schools (U.S.), University of Akron (U.S.), University of Texas (U.S.).

Healthcare:  Al Emadi Hospital (Qatar), Chemnitz Hospital (Germany), El Emadi Hospital (Qatar), Fu Jian Hospital (China), Nations Health (Philippines), Ren Ming Hospital (China), Whitby Hospital (Canada).

Transportation / Infrastructure:  Bangkok Airport (Thailand), Brasilia Airport (Brazil), Casablanca Airport (Morocco), Munich Airport (Germany), Perth Airport (Australia), Rhode Island Department of Transportation (U.S.).

References

Privately held companies of Canada
Companies based in Waterloo, Ontario
Technology companies established in 2003
2003 establishments in Ontario